SEAVI Advent Private Equity (South East Asia Venture Investment) is the first private equity and venture capital firm in Southeast Asia.  Since its founding in 1984 by Peter Brooke, the firm has invested over US$800 million into more than 120 Asian companies.  SEAVI Advent operates from three offices and is the Asia affiliate of Advent International, with an established long-term strategic partnership with Advent International in the Greater China region.

Since 1996, SEAVI Advent has a strong presence and substantial investments in Greater China. Previous projects in China include investments such as Yangzijiang Shipbuilding, Sinofriends (also known as ZhenAi Wang) and Weimob.

History 
Formed by Advent International, Orange Nassau, International Finance Corporation and DBS Bank in 1984, SEAVI Advent was founded by Peter Brooke, who has previously also founded TA Associates and Advent International.

Since then, SEAVI Advent is managed by Tan Keng Boon and Derrick Lee, its two founding managing partners.

First established in Singapore, SEAVI Advent has expanded in Asia, with offices in Singapore, Hong Kong and Shanghai.

Investments 
As of 2020, SEAVI Advent has taken more than 41 portfolio companies public on seven Asian stock exchanges, including Singapore, Hong Kong, Indonesia and Shenzhen, as well as the New York Stock Exchange.  Previous investments include significant minority equity investments, minority or majority recapitalizations, mezzanine financing, leveraged transaction and management buyouts. The company invests in a large range of sectors, including but not limited to business services, retail, technology, healthcare, consumer and logistics.

In 1984, SEAVI Advent raised its first fund, focusing on venture capital and technology transfer in Singapore and Malaysia.  Since then, SEAVI Advent is managing its sixth fund, focusing on growth stage investments and pre-IPO and middle market buyouts in China, Hong Kong, Singapore, Indonesia and other South East Asian markets.

According to Preqin, SEAVI Advent Equity IV, SEAVI Advent's fourth fund is ranked fourth in the top-performing ASEAN-based private equity funds of all vintages, with a net IRR of 29.9%.

SEAVI Advent was one of the investors that teamed-up with Li & Fung Ltd, one of Asia’s most successful trading and logistics companies, through Li & Fung (Distribution) Ltd. SEAVI Advent completed a complex transaction involving the purchase of the Asia Pacific marketing, distributing and warehouse businesses of Inchcape Plc for US$220 million.

In 2006, SEAVI Advent led the restructuring of Yangzijiang Shipbuilding, one of China's largest privately owned shipbuilders, and successfully listed the company on the Singapore Exchange. This project is one of the largest IPOs by a foreign company in Singapore.

In 2018, SEAVI Advent invested US$25 million in Chinese software developer and social advertising service provider Weimob, and listed the company on the Hong Kong Stock Exchange. SEAVI Advent focuses on investing in later-stage growth companies in more high-tech and service-related businesses.

References

External links
Official website

Financial services companies of China
Private equity firms of Asia-Pacific